An underground base is a subterranean facility used for military or scientific purposes.

Examples are:

 Cheyenne Mountain Complex
 Chiashan Air Force Base
 Iranian underground missile bases
 Raven Rock Mountain Complex
 Zeljava Air Base

There may be more than 10,000 underground military facilities worldwide.

See also
Underground living

References

Subterranea (geography)
Military installations